Mikhail Avdeev is a Russian politician, who, since 2011, has been a Member of the State Duma, representing the Moscow Oblast. He is a member of the Communist Party of the Russian Federation. He currently serves as Deputy Chairman of the State Duma committee on land relations and construction.

Biography
Born 6 March 1977 in Moscow. After graduation, he held various managerial positions at companies in the Moscow region. In 2010, he graduated with honors, majoring in law, from the Russian Presidential Academy of National Economy and Public Administration.

In 2007, he was elected a deputy of the Moscow Oblast Duma as a member of the Communist Party. He served as Chairman of the Committee on Economic and Innovation Policy. In December 2011 he was elected to the State Duma of Russia, representing the Moscow Oblast. In the State Duma he served as deputy chairman of the Committee on Land Relations and Construction. He headed the Expert Council on Land Relations under the committee. He currently holds the position of First Deputy Chairman of the Committee on Transport and Construction. He is also a member of the Central Committee of the Communist Party.

In January 2020 the State Duma removed Avdeev's parliamentary powers.

Legislative action
From 2011 to 2019, during the exercise of the powers of a deputy of the State Duma of the VI and VII convocations, he co-authored 21 legislative initiatives and amendments to draft federal laws.

Awards, bonuses, other distinctions
Awarded:
 Certificate of Honor of the President of the Russian Federation
 The honorary sign of the State Duma "For Merits in the Development of Parliamentarism"
 Certificate of Honor of the State Duma
 Certificate of Merit of the Moscow Regional Duma
 Sign of the Governor of the Moscow Region "Thank you"
 Badge of the Governor of the Moscow Region "For Useful"
 The badge of honor of the Moscow Regional Duma "For contribution to the development of legislation"
 Badge of Honor of the Moscow Regional Duma "For Works"

References

Living people
1977 births
Communist Party of the Russian Federation members
Politicians from Moscow
Sixth convocation members of the State Duma (Russian Federation)
Seventh convocation members of the State Duma (Russian Federation)
Eighth convocation members of the State Duma (Russian Federation)